Faneuil Hall ( or ; previously ) is a marketplace and meeting hall located near the waterfront and today's Government Center, in Boston, Massachusetts. Opened in 1742, it was the site of several speeches by Samuel Adams, James Otis, and others encouraging independence from Great Britain. It is now part of Boston National Historical Park and a well-known stop on the Freedom Trail. It is sometimes referred to as "the Cradle of Liberty", though the building and location have ties to slavery.

In 2008, Faneuil Hall was rated number 4 in "America's 25 Most Visited Tourist Sites" by Forbes Traveler.

History

18th century
After the project of erecting a public market house in Boston had been discussed for some years, slave merchant Peter Faneuil offered, at a public meeting in 1740, to build a suitable edifice at his own cost as a gift to the town. There was a strong opposition to market houses, and although a vote of thanks was passed unanimously, his offer was accepted by a majority of only seven. Funded in part by profits from slave trading, the building was begun in Dock Square in September of the same year. It was built by artist John Smibert in 1740–1742 in the style of an English country market, with an open ground floor serving as the market house, and an assembly room above. According to Sean Hennessey, a National Park Service spokesman, some of Boston's early slave auctions took place near Faneuil Hall.

In 1761, the hall was destroyed by fire, with nothing but the brick walls remaining. It was rebuilt by the town in 1762. In 1775, during the British occupation of Boston, it was used for a theatre.

19th century 
In 1806, the hall was greatly expanded by Charles Bulfinch, doubling its height and width and adding a third floor. Four new bays were added, to make seven in all; the open arcades were enclosed, and the cupola was moved to the opposite end of the building. Bulfinch applied Doric brick pilasters to the lower two floors, with Ionic pilasters on the third floor. This renovation added galleries around the assembly hall and increased its height. Faneuil Hall was used for town meetings until 1822. Neighboring Quincy Market was constructed in 1824–1826. Faneuil Hall was entirely rebuilt of noncombustible materials in 1898–1899.

20th and 21st centuries
On October 9, 1960, the building was designated a National Historic Landmark and added to the National Register of Historic Places following the passage of the National Historic Preservation Act of 1966, which placed all National Historic Landmarks in the National Register. The ground floor and basement were altered in 1979. The Hall was restored again in 1992, and in 1994 the building was designated a local Boston Landmark by the Boston Landmarks Commission.

The headquarters of the Ancient and Honorable Artillery Company of Massachusetts is located on the fourth floor and includes an armory, library, offices, quartermaster department, commissary, and a military museum with free admission.

Faneuil Hall Marketplace

Faneuil Hall is one of four historic buildings in a festival marketplace, Faneuil Hall Marketplace, which includes three historic granite buildings called North Market, Quincy Market, and South Market adjacent to the east of Faneuil Hall, and which operates as an indoor/outdoor mall and food eatery. It was designed by Benjamin Thompson and Associates and managed by the Rouse Company; its success in the late 1970s led to the emergence of similar marketplaces in other U.S. cities. It has since come under the ownership of the Ashkenazy Corp.

According to Ashkenazy, Faneuil Hall Marketplace had 18 million visitors in 2016.

The North and South Markets buildings are currently under study for landmark status by the Boston Landmarks Commission.

Uses
On Friday in early August 1890, one of the first black Republican legislators of Boston, Julius Caesar Chappelle, made a speech "At the Cradle of Liberty" in support of the Federal Elections bill that would help give Black people the right to vote. Chappelle was a Boston legislator from 1883 to 1886. The Faneuil Hall event was covered by the media in the United States, and the speech by Chappelle appeared in an August 9, 1890, article, "At the Cradle of Liberty, Enthusiastic Endorsement of the Elections Bill, Faneuil Hall again Filled with Liberty Loving Bostonians to Urge a Free Ballot and Fare Count..." on the front page of The New York Age newspaper on Saturday, August 9, 1890.

On November 7, 1979, Faneuil Hall was the site of Sen. Edward M. Kennedy's speech declaring his candidacy for president. On November 3, 2004, Faneuil Hall was the site of Senator John Kerry's concession speech in the 2004 presidential election.

On April 11, 2006, Governor Mitt Romney signed Massachusetts' healthcare bill into law with a fife and drum band in Faneuil Hall before 300 ticketed guests.

On October 30, 2013, President Barack Obama delivered a defense of the Affordable Care Act from the same spot where Romney signed his state's expansion of healthcare in 2006.

On November 2, 2014, Boston Mayor Thomas Menino lay in state at Faneuil Hall following his death on October 30, 2014.

The headquarters of the Ancient and Honorable Artillery Company of Massachusetts has been in Faneuil Hall since 1746, currently on the 4th floor.

It is also still used for political debates between Massachusetts candidates as well as political shows, such as The O'Reilly Factor.

Name
In Colonial times, it may have been pronounced as in funnel. Peter Faneuil's gravestone is marked "P. Funel." However, the inscription was added long after his burial; the stone originally displayed only the Faneuil family crest, not his surname. In his 1825 novel Lionel Lincoln, James Fenimore Cooper used eye dialect for Bostonian characters to indicate that they pronounced it Funnel Hall.

Boston area locals often use the term Faneuil to refer to the entire surrounding neighborhood, particularly as a landmark for its vibrant nightlife.

In August 2017, amid heightened media coverage of the removal of Confederate monuments and memorials, the activist group New Democracy Coalition proposed that Faneuil Hall's name be changed because of Peter Faneuil's participation in the slave trade. In response to the proposal, Boston mayor Marty Walsh stated: "We are not going to change the name of Faneuil Hall". Many protests have been a result of the push for a name change, including activists chaining themselves to the front door and a sit-in.

Building elements

Bell
The bell was repaired in 2007 by spraying the frozen clapper with WD-40 over the course of a week and attaching a rope. Prior to this repair, the last known ringing of the bell with its clapper was at the end of World War II, in 1945, though it had since been rung several times by striking with a mallet.

Grasshopper weather vane
The gilded grasshopper weather vane on top of the building was created by Deacon Shem Drowne in 1742. The weather vane is believed to be modeled after the grasshopper weather vane on the London Royal Exchange, based upon the family crest of Thomas Gresham.

Public art and landscape artwork

The area between the eastern end of Faneuil Hall and Congress Street is part of Boston National Historical Park. In this landscape is a 19th-century sculpture of Samuel Adams created by sculptor Anne Whitney. The street layout and building plot plan designations from an 1820 map are shown by etched dashed lines and changes from pink granite to grey granite paving slabs. The shoreline marking artwork entitled, A Once and Future Shoreline, is made with etched silhouettes of seaweed, sea grass, fish, shells and other materials found along a high tide line.

Art within Faneuil Hall includes many paintings and sculpture busts of Revolutionary War activists, pre Civil War abolitionists, and political leaders.

Timeline of events
1761 – Hall burned down.
 1762 – Hall rebuilt.
 1767 – October 28: Petition to boycott imported goods signed.
 1768 – Faneuil Hall is briefly used to quarter the newly arrived 14th Regiment during the occupation of Boston.
 1773 – December 3: Meeting about tea lately arrived on the ship Eleanor; Capt. James Bruce, Samuel Adams, Jonathan Williams, and others present
 1806 – Building remodelled and expanded by Charles Bulfinch
 August 2, 1826 – Daniel Webster eulogizes John Adams and Thomas Jefferson
 July 11, 1831 – Timothy Fuller speaks "at the request of the Suffolk Anti-Masonic Committee"
 September 6, 1834 – Edward Everett eulogizes Lafayette
 1837
 Wendell Phillips speaks
 1st Exhibition and Fair of the Massachusetts Charitable Mechanic Association
 1839 – Peleg Sprague stumps for candidate William Henry Harrison
 July 4, 1843 – Charles Francis Adams Sr. speaks
 April 15, 1848 – Edward Everett eulogizes John Quincy Adams
 May 26, 1854 – After arrest of Anthony Burns, public meeting "to secure justice for a man claimed as a slave by a Virginia kidnapper, and imprisoned in Boston Court House, in defiance of the laws of Massachusetts."
 April 18, 1863 – Andrew Jackson Hamilton "of Texas" speaks "at the war meeting"
 January 9, 1865 – Edward Everett speaks on "the relief of the suffering people of Savannah"
 June 7, 1876 – Meeting "in favor of public parks;" Oliver Wendell Holmes Sr. and others speak
 August 1, 1878 – "Indignation meeting ... to protest against the injury done to the freedom of the press by the conviction and imprisonment of Ezra H. Heywood"
 October 29, 1887 – Eben Norton Horsford speaks on occasion of the unveiling of Anne Whitney's Leif Ericson statue (installed on Commonwealth Ave.)
 August 1890 – Julius Caesar Chappelle, Republican legislator of Boston, MA (1883–1886), one of the first black legislators in the United States, makes a speech (endorsing the Federal Elections bill that would help give blacks the right to vote) that was printed in The New York Age newspaper's front-page article, "At the Cradle of Liberty" on August 9, 1890. 
 June 15, 1898 – James E. McCormick published a letter in the Boston Evening Transcript on June 2 which led to a June 15 meeting at Faneuil Hall, thus the founding of the American Anti-Imperialist League in opposition to the Spanish–American War as well the subsequent Filipino-American War. To note one of the league's more familiar names, Mark Twain served as vice-president from 1901 to his passing in 1910.
 1903
 March 4 – Frederic J. Stimson debates James F. Carey
 March 19 – Protest "against the suppression of truth about the Philippines"
 May 1909 – 32nd Grand Division (Order of Railroad Conductors)ORC Convention
 1974 – Weathervane stolen, then returned
 1992 – Building restored
 2012 – Lower Level and First Level completely renovated by Eastern General Contractors, Inc. of Springfield, MA

Gallery

See also 
 Dock Square (Boston, Massachusetts)
 Harborplace
 South Street Seaport
 Boston Landmarks Commission
 List of National Historic Landmarks in Boston
 National Register of Historic Places listings in northern Boston, Massachusetts

References
Notes

Further reading
 Abram English Brown (1901) Faneuil hall and Faneuil Hall Market: or, Peter Faneuil and His Gift. Boston: Lee and Shepard.
 Burgon, John William (1839) Life and Times of Sir Thomas Gresham. London: Robert Jennings

External links

 Faneuil Hall Marketplace
 Faneuil Hall (City of Boston)
 Faneuil Hall (National Park Service)
 (Official website of the Freedom Trail)
 Suffolk County listings (National Register of Historic Places)
 Boston Classical Orchestra
 Historic American Buildings Survey, Library of Congress. Includes 1937 photos.
SAH Archipedia Building Entry
Faneuil Hall Study Report

Boston National Historical Park
Commercial buildings in Boston
Commercial buildings on the National Register of Historic Places in Massachusetts
Event venues on the National Register of Historic Places in Massachusetts
Charles Bulfinch buildings
Commercial buildings completed in 1762
Market houses
National Historic Landmarks in Boston
Shopping malls in Massachusetts
1743 establishments in Massachusetts
Landmarks in Boston
National Register of Historic Places in Boston
Government Center, Boston
Georgian architecture